Haute-Saône (Arpitan: Hiôta-Sona; English: Upper Saône) is a department in the Bourgogne-Franche-Comté region of northeastern France. Named after the river Saône, it had a population of 235,313 in 2019. Its prefecture is Vesoul; its sole subprefecture is Lure.

History 
The department was created in the early years of the French Revolution through the application of a law dated 22 December 1789, from part of the former province of Franche-Comté. The frontiers of the new department corresponded approximately to those of the old Bailiwick of Amont.

The department was also marked by the Franco-Prussian War with the battles of Héricourt, and Villersexel but also the proximity of the Siege of Belfort. The department welcomes Alsatians fleeing the annexation of Alsace-Lorraine.

The department has an important mining and industrial past (coal, salt, iron, lead-silver-copper mines, bituminous shale, stationery, spinning, weaving, forges, foundries, tileries, mechanical factories).

Geography 
Haute-Saône is part of the Bourgogne-Franche-Comté region, and is divided into 2 arrondissements and 17 cantons. Neighbouring departments are Côte-d'Or to the west, Haute-Marne to the north-west, Vosges to the north, Territoire de Belfort to the east, Doubs to the south and east and Jura to south.

The department can be presented as a transitional territory positioned between several of the more depressed departments of eastern France and the so-called Blue Banana zone characterised, in recent decades by relatively powerful economic growth.

Economy 
The department is overwhelmingly rural, despite the area having been at the forefront of industrialisation in the eighteenth century. The industrial tradition endures, but industrial businesses tend to be on a small scale. In 2006 employment by economic sector was reported as follows:

 * Agriculture 4,919 employees
 * Construction 4,504 employees
 * Industrial sector 18,747 employees
 * Service sector 44,865 employees

Demographics 

In common with many rural departments in France, Haute-Saône has experienced a savage reduction in population, from nearly 350,000 in the middle of the nineteenth century to barely 200,000 on the eve of the Second World War, as people migrated to newly industrialising population centres, often outside Metropolitan France.

During the second half of the twentieth century the mass mobility conferred by the surge in automobile ownership permitted some recovery of the population figure to approximately 234,000 in 2004.

Principal towns

The rural nature of the department is highlighted by the absence of large towns and cities. Even the department's capital, Vesoul, still has a population below 20,000. As of 2019, there are 5 communes with more than 5,000 inhabitants:

Politics

The president of the Departmental Council is Yves Krattinger, first elected in 2001.

Current National Assembly Representatives

Tourism

See also
County of Burgundy - History
Franche-Comté
Cantons of the Haute-Saône department
Communes of the Haute-Saône department
Arrondissements of the Haute-Saône department
Arpitan language

References

External links
  Prefecture website
  Departmental Council website 
  Tourism website

 
1790 establishments in France
Departments of Bourgogne-Franche-Comté
States and territories established in 1790